Roman Spirig (born 7 January 1998) is a Liechtensteiner footballer who plays as a left-back for Chur 97 and the Liechtenstein national team.

Career
Spirig made his international debut for Liechtenstein on 3 June 2021 in a friendly match against Switzerland.

Career statistics

International

References

External links
 

1998 births
Living people
Sportspeople from the canton of St. Gallen
Liechtenstein footballers
Liechtenstein youth international footballers
Liechtenstein under-21 international footballers
Liechtenstein international footballers
Swiss men's footballers
Swiss people of Liechtenstein descent
People with acquired Liechtenstein citizenship
Association football fullbacks
FC Vaduz players
FC Dornbirn 1913 players
USV Eschen/Mauren players
FC Balzers players
Swiss 1. Liga (football) players
Liechtenstein expatriate footballers
Liechtenstein expatriates in Austria
Expatriate footballers in Austria